Sonnet 38 is one of 154 sonnets written by the English playwright and poet William Shakespeare. It is a member of the Fair Youth sequence, in which the lyric subject expresses its love towards a young man.

Structure
Sonnet 38 is an English or Shakespearean sonnet, composed of three quatrains and a final rhyming couplet. It follows the form's typical rhyme scheme, ABAB CDCD EFEF GG. Like other Shakespearean sonnets the poem is composed in a type of poetic metre known as iambic pentameter based on five pairs of metrically weak/strong syllabic positions. The final line exemplifies a regular iambic pentameter:

  ×  /    ×  /     ×    /     ×    /   ×   / 
The pain be mine, but thine shall be the praise. (38.14)
/ = ictus, a metrically strong syllabic position. × = nonictus.

Notes

Further reading

External links
Analysis

British poems
Sonnets by William Shakespeare